Videmala is a municipality located in the province of Zamora, Castile and León, Spain. According to the 2004 census (INE), the municipality has a population of 216 inhabitants.

Town hall
Videmala is home to the town hall of 2 villages:
Videmala (103 inhabitants, INE 2020).
Villanueva de los Corchos (41 inhabitants, INE 2020).

References

Municipalities of the Province of Zamora